Florida is a rural locality (a village) in Sizemskoye  Settlement, Sheksninsky District, Vologda Oblast, Russia. The population was 1 as of 2002.

Geography 
Florida is located 36 km north of Sheksna (the district's administrative centre) by road. Pyzheyevo is the nearest locality. it has nothing to do with the American state

References 

Rural localities in Sheksninsky District